St. Catherine's Lutheran Church, also known as Biķeri or Biķernieki church for its location, is a Lutheran church in Riga, the capital of Latvia. It is a parish church of the Evangelical Lutheran Church of Latvia. The church is situated at the address 146 Biķernieku Street.

References 

Churches in Riga